No End of Love is a bluegrass album by American musician John Hartford, released in 1996 (see 1996 in music).

Track listing

 "Dialog" – 0:07
 "No End of Love" – 4:04
 "Dialog" – 0:17
 "When Guiding Star Came to Tell City" – 5:26
 "Dialog" – 0:14
 "Gentle on My Mind" – 3:36
 "Railroad Cap" – 2:02
 "Down on the Levee" – 3:11
 "My Tears Don't Show" (Carl Butler) – 3:17
 "Dialog" – 0:55
 "The Burning of the Grand Republic" – 3:16
 "Dialog" – 0:11
 "Uncle Dink" – 2:44
 "Dialog" – 0:08
 "Medicine Chest" – 2:09
 "Goodbye Waltz" – 5:19

Personnel
John Hartford – vocals, banjo, fiddle, guitar
Mike Compton - mandolin

References

External links
LP Discography of John Hartford.

John Hartford albums
1996 albums